Helen E. Wainwright (March 15, 1906 – October 11, 1965), also known by her married name Helen Stelling, was a competition diver and swimmer who represented the United States at the 1920 Summer Olympics and 1924 Summer Olympics. She remains the only woman to ever win Olympic silver medals in both swimming and diving.

Biography

Helen Wainwright was the daughter of John Wainwright, a bricklayer from Lancaster, England, who emigrated to New York in 1888.

She was a member of the Women's Swimming Association (WSA) of New York. Swimming coach Louis de B. Handley called Wainwright the world's fastest swimmer. She won 19 gold medals in U.S. national championships, 17 of them for swimming and the other two for diving events.

At the 1920 Olympics in Antwerp, aged just 14 years old, Wainwright won the silver medal in the women's 3-meter springboard competition. Four years later, at the 1924 Olympics in Paris, she won the silver medal in the women's 400-meter freestyle event.

On August 19, 1922, Wainwright set a world record in the women's 1500 metres freestyle swimming event, which stood for over three years.

Shortly after the 1924 Olympics, she performed in swimming-and-diving shows at the New York Hippodrome along with fellow Olympians Aileen Riggin and Gertrude Ederle. They later toured round some of the biggest theaters in the U.S. using a portable water tank.

Wainwright very nearly became the first woman to swim the English Channel in 1925; she was selected by the WSA to make the attempt but was forced to pull out due to an injury, so her teammate Gertrude Ederle was chosen to take her place.

In the 1930s, she became a swimming coach on cruise liners out of New York. She married a career military man, Lt. Cree Stelling.

Wainwright was inducted into the International Swimming Hall of Fame in 1972.

See also
 List of members of the International Swimming Hall of Fame
 List of athletes with Olympic medals in different disciplines
 List of Olympic medalists in swimming (women)
 World record progression 1500 metres freestyle

References

External links

 Helen Wainwright pictures on Getty Images
 
 

1906 births
1965 deaths
American female divers
American female freestyle swimmers
Divers at the 1920 Summer Olympics
World record setters in swimming
Olympic silver medalists for the United States in diving
Olympic silver medalists for the United States in swimming
Olympic medalists in diving
Sportspeople from New York City
Swimmers at the 1924 Summer Olympics
Medalists at the 1924 Summer Olympics
Medalists at the 1920 Summer Olympics
20th-century American women
20th-century American people